Glade (/gleɪd/) is an American brand of household air fresheners that were first introduced in 1956. Glade is a worldwide brand owned by S. C. Johnson & Son, known variously around the world as Glade, Gleid, Brise (Germany, France and the Netherlands), etc. Brise was renamed Glade in Germany, France and the Netherlands in 2012.

List of Glade products

The Glade family of products include: Aerosol sprays, Candles, Car Scented Oil, Carpet & Room, Glass Scents, PlugIns, PlugIns Scented Gel, PlugIns Scented Oil, Press'n Fresh, Secrets, Scented Oil Candles, and Wisp.

Aerosol
 Glade Aerosol - Blue Odyssey
 Glade Aerosol - Clean Linen
 Glade Aerosol - Country Garden
 Glade Aerosol - Crisp waters
 Glade Aerosol - French Vanilla
 Glade Aerosol - Fruit Explosion
 Glade Aerosol - Hawaiian Breeze
 Glade Aerosol - Jasmine & White Rose
 Glade Aerosol - Lavender & Vanilla
 Glade Aerosol - Lilac Spring
 Glade Aerosol - Neutralizer
 Glade Aerosol - Powder Fresh
 Glade Aerosol - Rainshower
 Glade Aerosol - Tropical Mist
 Glade Aerosol - White Tea & Lily
 Glade Aerosol - Blooming Peony & Cherry

Candles
 Glade Candles - Cashmere Woods
 Glade Candles - Apple Cinnamon
 Glade Candles - Angel Whisper
 Glade Candles - Clean Linen
 Glade Candles - French Vanilla
 Glade Candles - Glistening Snow - Cancelled 2009
 Glade Candles - Lavender Meadow
 Glade Candles - Melon Burst
 Glade Candles - Mountain Berry
 Glade Candles - Pumpkin Pie
 Glade Candles - Rainshower
 Glade Candles - Refreshing Spa
 Glade Candles - Strawberries & Cream
 Glade Candles - Fresh Mountain Morning

3 In 1 Candle
 Glade 3 In 1 Candle - Baking With Grandma
 Glade 3 In 1 Candle - Berry Picking
 Glade 3 In 1 Candle - Evening At Home
 Glade 3 In 1 Candle - Starlit Garden
 Glade 3 In 1 Candle - Lighting

Car Scented Oil
 Glade Car Scented Oil - Jasmine Mist
 Glade Car Scented Oil - Tropical Moment
 Glade Car Scented Oil - Outdoor Fresh
 Glade Car Scented Oil - Ocean Blue

Carpet & Room
 Glade Carpet & Room - Country Garden
 Glade Carpet & Room - French Vanilla
 Glade Carpet & Room - Fresh Scent
 Glade Carpet & Room - Lilac Spring
 Glade Carpet & Room - Melon Burst
 Glade Carpet & Room - Neutralizer
 Glade Carpet & Room - Rainshower
 Shake n' Vac

Fragrant Mist
 Glade Fragrant Mist - Alpine Spice
 Glade Fragrant Mist - Country Garden

PlugIns

The original concept for PlugIns came from a man named Frederick Gammon who invented it while working for Johnson & Johnson.
 Glade PlugIns - Apple Cinnamon
 Glade PlugIns - Citrus Zest
 Glade PlugIns - Clean Linen
 Glade PlugIns - Country Garden
 Glade PlugIns - Country Spice
 Glade PlugIns - Glistening Snow - Cancelled 2009
 Glade PlugIns - Island Breeze
 Glade PlugIns - Lilac Spring
 Glade PlugIns - Mango Splash
 Glade PlugIns - Mountain Berry
 Glade PlugIns - Mountain Meadow
 Glade PlugIns - Mountain Snow
 Glade PlugIns - Natural Springs
 Glade PlugIns - Rainshower
 Glade PlugIns - Refreshing Spa
 Glade PlugIns - Strawberry
 Glade PlugIns - Tropical Garden
 Glade PlugIns - Vanilla Garden

PlugIns Scented Gel

 Glade PlugIns Scented Gel - Lavender & Vanilla

PlugIns Scented Oil
 Glade PlugIns Scented Oil - Apple Cinnamon
 Glade PlugIns Scented Oil - Butterfly Garden
 Glade PlugIns Scented Oil - Clean Linen
 Glade PlugIns Scented Oil - Clear Springs
 Glade PlugIns Scented Oil - Ferns and Blossoms
 Glade PlugIns Scented Oil - Floral Escape
 Glade PlugIns Scented Oil - Glistening Snow - Cancelled 2009
 Glade PlugIns Scented Oil - Hawaiian Breeze
 Glade PlugIns Scented Oil - Jasmine & White Rose
 Glade PlugIns Scented Oil - Lavender Meadow
 Glade PlugIns Scented Oil - Mystical Garden
 Glade PlugIns Scented Oil - Mango Fusion
 Glade PlugIns Scented Oil - Ocean Blue
 Glade PlugIns Scented Oil - Refreshing Citrus
 Glade PlugIns Scented Oil - Rainshower
 Glade PlugIns Scented Oil - Seaside Garden
 Glade PlugIns Scented Oil - Sky Breeze
 Glade PlugIns Scented Oil - Summer Berries
 Glade PlugIns Scented Oil - Vanilla Breeze

Press 'N Fresh
 Glade Press 'N Fresh - Country Garden
 Glade Press 'N Fresh - Just Orange
 Glade Press 'N Fresh - Rainshower

Quick 'N Fresh
 Glade Quick 'N Fresh - Country Garden
 Glade Quick 'N Fresh - Sunny Days

Secrets
 Glade Secrets - Country Garden
 Glade Secrets - Floral Breeze
 Glade Secrets - Lavender Meadow
 Glade Secrets - Rainshower
 Glade Secrets - Summer cravings

Solid Air Fresheners
 Glade Solid Air Freshener - Angel Whispers
 Glade Solid Air Freshener - Apple Cinnamon
 Glade Solid Air Freshener - Clean Linen
 Glade Solid Air Freshener - Clear Springs (Tough Odor Solutions)
 Glade Solid Air Freshener - Crisp Waters
 Glade Solid Air Freshener - French Vanilla
 Glade Solid Air Freshener - Fresh Berries
 Glade Solid Air Freshener - Fresh Scent for Pet Odors (Tough Odor Solutions)
 Glade Solid Air Freshener - Hawaiian Breeze
 Glade Solid Air Freshener - Lavender & Vanilla

Holiday products 

In the late 2005, Glade introduced candles inspired by artist Thomas Kinkade. Both candles had a different wintry scene printed on the jar and offered the choice of vanilla, apple cinnamon, or pumpkin pie scent.

Competition 
Glade's two main competitors in the air freshener market are Air Wick and Renuzit. Formerly, Wizard Scented Oils was also a competitor to Glade as well until it was discontinued due to poor sales.

References

External links
 S.C. Johnson Company
 

Cleaning product brands
Cleaning products
Cleaning product components
American brands
S. C. Johnson & Son brands
Products introduced in 1956